Gibril Sankoh (born 15 May 1983) is a Sierra Leone former professional footballer who played as a centre back.

Club career
Sankoh played in Freetown at Royal Stars and was selected for the Sierra Leone national football team at the age of 17, but would not make his debut. In 2000, he was forced to flee since he had the same surname as rebel leader Foday Sankoh, even though he is not related to him. He arrived in  The Netherlands by boat and ended up in an asylum seekers' centre in Rijsbergen. After moving to Heemskerk, he went to play at De Kennemers in Beverwijk. There he was scouted for Stormvogels Telstar.

In the 2004–05 season Sankoh made the transfer to FC Groningen after having played seventeen games for Stormvogels Telstar. In the 05/06 season, Sankoh became a fixture of 'the Pride of the North' and contributed significantly to its success in the following season. In the playoffs of the 2006–07 season, Sankoh scored his first goal for Groningen in the home game against Feyenoord, which was won 2–1. Partly because of this goal, Groningen reached the final of the playoffs. In May 2010, it was announced that Sankoh had to leave FC Groningen after six seasons. His expiring contract was not renewed.

Sankoh was contracted by FC Augsburg from the 2010–11 season, where he signed for two years. This started in the 2. Bundesliga, but followed after a year of promotion to the Bundesliga. He played less and in his third year at the club even less. In February 2013 he switched to the Chinese Henan Jianye FC.

Sankoh returned to the Netherlands in July 2015. He completed training courses with his old team FC Groningen and with PEC Zwolle. In July, he signed a contract until mid-2016 with Roda JC Kerkrade, which had just been promoted to the Eredivisie. He had included in his contract the possibility to exchange the club for another after half a season. After half a year, he left the club to return to China. He went to play football with second divisionist Meizhou Kejia F.C., where he signed a contract for two years. After six months without a club, he played for ACV in mid-2018 till the end of mid-2019.

Sankoh is currently assistant coach for the under 17 team of FC Groningen.

International career
On 8 September 2012, at the age of 29, he made his debut for the West African nation in a qualification match against Tunisia for the 2013 Africa Cup of Nations. The Leone Stars were just slightly eliminated and Sankoh got a red card in the second match against the same team on 13 October.

Honours
Henan Jianye
China League One: 2013

References

External links
 
 
 

1983 births
Living people
Sierra Leonean footballers
SC Telstar players
FC Groningen players
FC Augsburg players
Henan Songshan Longmen F.C. players
Roda JC Kerkrade players
Meizhou Hakka F.C. players
Eerste Divisie players
Eredivisie players
Bundesliga players
2. Bundesliga players
Chinese Super League players
China League One players
Sierra Leonean expatriate footballers
Expatriate footballers in the Netherlands
Expatriate footballers in Germany
Expatriate footballers in China
Sierra Leonean expatriate sportspeople in the Netherlands
Sierra Leone international footballers
Association football defenders